Aquaporin-8 is a protein that in humans is encoded by the AQP8 gene.

Aquaporin-8 (AQP-8) is a water channel protein. Aquaporins are a family of small integral membrane proteins related to the major intrinsic protein (MIP or AQP0).  Aquaporin-8 mRNA is found in pancreas and colon but not other tissues.

References

Further reading

External links